Actaea rubra, the red baneberry or chinaberry, is a poisonous herbaceous flowering plant in the family Ranunculaceae, native to North America.

Description

The leaves are coarsely toothed with deeply lobed margins. Plants commonly have hairy veins on the undersides of the foliage. Each stem will have either three leaves that branch near the top, or will have three compound leaves and one upright flowering stalk from one point on the main central stem.

Plants produce one to a few ternately branched stems which bear clusters of flowers having 3 to 5 sepals that are petal-like and obovate in shape and remain after flowering. The petals are deciduous, falling away after flowering is done. Flowers have numerous stamens and they are white in color.

After flowering green berries are produced. The fruits are ellipsoid shaped berries containing several seeds.  In mid to late summer, the berries turn bright red, or white in forma neglecta. The berries also have a black dot on them.

Distribution and habitat
They are found growing in shady areas with moist to wet soils, open forest or dry slopes in much of North America except for Greenland, Nunavut, Mexico, Texas, and the south-eastern United States. In Alaska it ranges from the Kenai Peninsula, through Kodiak Island, Bristol Bay, and up the Yukon River.

Ecology
Plants are slow growing and take a few years to grow large enough to flower. The western subspecies is ssp. arguta, and the northern subspecies is ssp. rubra. These subspecies are not well differentiated, and in many locations, each grades in to the other over much of their ranges. The foliage is rarely consumed by grazing animals. The poisonous berries are harmless to birds, the plants' primary seed disperser.

Uses
This plant is grown in shade gardens for its attractive berries and upright clump forming habit.

Native Americans have traditionally used the juice from the fruits of various baneberry species to poison arrows.

Toxicity
All parts of the plant are poisonous. However, accidental poisoning is not likely since the berries are extremely bitter.

The berries are the most toxic part of the plant. A healthy adult will experience poisoning from as few as six berries. Ingestion of the berries causes nausea, dizziness, increased pulse and severe gastrointestinal discomfort. The toxins can also have an immediate sedative effect on the cardiac muscle tissue possibly leading to cardiac arrest if introduced into the bloodstream. As few as two berries may be fatal to a child.

The fruits and foliage contain ranunculin, and are often reported to contain protoanemonin. The plant also contains berberine.

All parts of the plant contain an irritant oil that is most concentrated within the roots and berries.

The roots contain β-sitosterol glucoside.

There have been no reported cases of severe poisoning or deaths in North America, but children have been fatally poisoned by its European relative A. spicata. It is claimed that poisoning is unlikely from eating the fruits of this species also.

This plant closely resembles mountain sweetroot (Osmorhiza chilensis), and can be confused with it; however, red baneberry lacks the strong anise-like "spicy celery" odor of mountain sweetroot.

The following illustrates a non-fatal case of experimental self-intoxication produced by the ingestion of fruit from Actaea rubra. The onset of symptoms began within 30 minutes.

References

External links

 Actaea rubra subspecies arguta (Red Baneberry)

rubra
Flora of Western Canada
Flora of Eastern Canada
Flora of the Northwestern United States
Flora of the Northeastern United States
Flora of the Southwestern United States
Flora of Alaska
Flora of Illinois
Flora of Iowa
Flora of Kansas
Flora of Minnesota
Flora of Nebraska
Flora of New Mexico
Flora of North Dakota
Flora of South Dakota
Flora of Wisconsin
Flora of the Northwest Territories
Flora of Yukon
Plants used in traditional Native American medicine